Ísleifur Friðriksson (born 30 July 1956) is an Icelandic sailor. He competed in the men's 470 event at the 1988 Summer Olympics.

References

External links
 

1956 births
Living people
Icelandic male sailors (sport)
Olympic sailors of Iceland
Sailors at the 1988 Summer Olympics – 470
Place of birth missing (living people)